Atelopus spumarius (Pebas stubfoot toad) is a species of toad in the family Bufonidae.
It is native to Brazil, Colombia, Ecuador, French Guiana, Guyana, Peru and Suriname.

Description 
Female Pebas stubfoot toads grow to be between 31 and 39 mm long, while their male counterparts only grow to be 26 to 29 mm long. Their heads are narrow and come to a point at the nose, the skin on their back is smooth with pale green and black stripes and black dots. They don't have any tympanum (eardrums).

Distribution and habitat 
The atelopus spumarius is native to South America, and lives in the rainforest near blackwater streams and the Tahuayo River.

References

spumarius
Amphibians of Brazil
Amphibians of Colombia
Amphibians of Ecuador
Amphibians of French Guiana
Amphibians of Guyana
Amphibians of Peru
Amphibians of Suriname
Amphibians described in 1871
Taxonomy articles created by Polbot